The Once is a folk trio based in St. John's, Newfoundland, Canada. The group features Geraldine Hollett on lead vocals and vocalist-instrumentalists Phil Churchill and Andrew Dale playing a variety of instruments. The group performs a mix of original and traditional material and is noted for their three part harmonies, which are sometimes performed a cappella.

History
The members of The Once met while taking part in a summer repertory theatre company in Trinity, Newfoundland. In August 2009, they released an eponymous album on Borealis Records. In 2014, the group went on Passenger's Whispers Tour through the US, Canada, Europe and Australia. The group also supported Passenger on his 2016 album, 'Young as the Morning Old as the Sea', and his 2018 album, 'Runaway'.

Awards
2009 Atlantis Music Prize (nominated for The Once)
2010 Canadian Folk Music Awards (won Traditional Album of the Year for The Once and New/Emerging Artist of the Year)
2011 East Coast Music Award (nominated for Group Recording of the Year for The Once)
2012 Juno Nomination Row Upon Row 
2015 Juno Nomination Departures

Discography
2009 - The Once
2011 - Row Upon Row of the People They Know
2012 - This is a Christmas Album
2014 - Departures
2016 - We Win Some We Lose (EP)
2018 - Time Enough
2022 - Acoustic Vol. 1ce

References

External links
 The Once (official website)

Canadian folk music groups
Musical groups from St. John's, Newfoundland and Labrador
Musical groups established in 2004
Canadian Folk Music Award winners
Nettwerk Music Group artists